Aller and Beer Woods is a  biological Site of Special Scientific Interest. off the A372 Othery to Langport road near Aller in Somerset. It was notified in 1952.

The reserve is about 40 ha (99 acres) and the underlying geology of most of it is Lias limestone. Prior to the twentieth century it appears to have been managed for centuries as traditional coppice woodlandd.

Aller and Beer Woods are outstanding examples of ancient, escarpment woodland managed in a traditional coppice-with-standards system. The woodland is a variant of the calcareous ash/Wych elm stand-type, with pedunculate oak (Quercus robur), and
ash (Fraxinus excelsior) the dominant canopy trees throughout, and with scattered concentrations of Wych elm (Ulmus glabra). Ancient woodland indicators include small-leaved lime (Tilia cordata), and wild service tree (Sorbus torminalis), both of which are locally common. Plants of particular interest include bird's nest orchid (Neottia nidus-avis), greater butterfly orchid (Platanthera chlorantha) and the very rare Red Data Book species purple gromwell (Lithospermum purpurocaeruleum).

Nearby is the Aller Hill SSSI.

References 

Sites of Special Scientific Interest in Somerset
Sites of Special Scientific Interest notified in 1952
Nature reserves in Somerset
Somerset Levels
Woodland Sites of Special Scientific Interest
Forests and woodlands of Somerset